Georg Curtius (April 16, 1820August 12, 1885) was a German philologist and distinguished comparativist.

Biography
Curtius was born in Lübeck, and was the brother of the historian and archeologist Ernst Curtius.  After an education at Bonn and Berlin, he was for three years a schoolmaster in Dresden, until (in 1845) he returned to Berlin University as privatdocent. In 1849 he was placed in charge of the Philological Seminary at Prague, and two years later was appointed professor of classical philology in Prague University. In 1854, he moved from Prague to a similar appointment at Kiel, and again in 1862 from Kiel to Leipzig. He was teaching lndo-European and the historical grammar of the classical languages at Leipzig. His is contributions were focused "to bridge the gulf between classical philology and Aryan linguistics." As a professor he constantly attempted " to bring Classical  Philology and the Science of  Language  into  closer  relation   with  each  other." This clearly reflected in the works of his pupils, and that of his own.

His philological theories exercised a widespread influence. The more important of his publications are:
Die Sprachvergleichung in ihrem Verhältniss zur classischen Philologie (1845; Eng. trans. by FH Trithen, 1851)
Sprachvergleichende Beiträge zur griechischen und lateinischen Grammatik (1846)
Grundzüge der griechischen Etymologie (1858–1862, 5th ed. 1879)
Das Verbum der griechischen Sprache (1873).
The last two works were translated into English by Augustus Samuel Wilkins and Edwin Bourdieu England.

From 1878 until his death Curtius was general editor of the Leipziger Studien zur classischen Philologie. His Griechische Schulgrammatik, first published in 1852, passed through more than twenty editions, and was edited in English. In his last work, Zur Kritik der neuesten Sprachforschung (1885), he attacked the views of the emerging Neogrammarian school of philology.

Curtius died in  Hermsdorf am Kynast, aged 65, and was succeeded at Leipzig by his studentKarl Brugmann.  The Opuscula of Georg Curtius were edited after his death by Ernst Windisch (Kleine Schriften von E. C., 1886–1887). He was posthumously elected to the American Philosophical Society in 1886.

Notes

References
 This work in turn cites:
    
Ernst Windisch in Conrad Bursian's Biographisches Jahrbuch für Alterthumskunde (1886)

External links
 
 

1820 births
1885 deaths
German philologists
Writers from Lübeck
Recipients of the Pour le Mérite (civil class)
Members of the American Philosophical Society